Li Zehua (born 1995) is a Chinese citizen journalist, rapper, and YouTuber. Li was born in Pingxiang, Jiangxi. After graduating from the Communication University of China, he joined China Central Television (CCTV) as a television presenter in 2016.

Journalism

2020
During the COVID-19 pandemic in China, he resigned from CCTV and found a way to get into Wuhan, hoping to trace disappeared journalist Chen Qiushi. With the help of locals, he was able to get a car and find a place to stay. In the following days, he used a vlog to report on the pandemic in Wuhan. He disappeared on 26 February 2020, presumed detained by officers from state security. Parts of his chase with the Wuhan authorities was caught on video and uploaded to YouTube. Li was supposedly taken to a police station, where he had fingerprints and blood samples taken, before being taken to an "interrogation room". He was told he was "suspected of disturbing public order", but was told there would be no penalty. Some reports stated that no one had heard from Li since his 26 February 2020, disappearance, while others stated that he returned to the hotel on 28 February.

On 22 April 2020, Li posted a video on YouTube, Twitter, and Weibo, and uploaded the English subtitle to YouTube in the following days. According to Li, he was escorted on 26 February to the police station and was under investigation for disrupting public order. Additionally, police detained and quarantined him, citing his visits to sensitive epidemic areas. Li's quarantine was at first in Wuhan, and later moved to his hometown. Li stated that he had been treated well by the police during the detention, and that he had been released on 28 March. According to The Guardian, Li's neutral tone in the video was "very different from his previous videos". Activist Ou Biaofeng stated the authorities may have told Li to make the brief statement.

At the end of his April 22 post, he quoted the Book of Documents aphorism, "the mind of man is restless, prone (to err); its affinity to what is right is small. Be discriminating, be uniform (in the pursuit of what is right), that you may sincerely hold fast the Mean." and gave his own interpretation in English:

2023
In January 2023, Li reappeared in the public light after nearly three years of silence to give an interview, during which he recounted the events leading to his arrest in February 2020 and restated his views on the lack of freedom for Chinese citizens.

See also 
 Chen Qiushi, a Chinese lawyer, activist, and citizen journalist who disappeared on 6 February 2020
 Fang Bin, a Chinese businessman, citizen journalist and whistleblower who disappeared in February 2020.
 List of solved missing person cases

References

External links
 

1995 births
2020s missing person cases
Communication University of China alumni
CCTV television presenters
Chinese journalists
Citizen journalists
Chinese YouTubers
Formerly missing people
Impact of the COVID-19 pandemic on journalism
Living people
Mandarin-language YouTube channels
Missing person cases in China
People from Pingxiang